Spanish is the official language of Guatemala. As a first and second language, Spanish is spoken by 93% of the population. Guatemalan Spanish is the local variant of the Spanish language.

Twenty-one Mayan languages are spoken, especially in rural areas, as well as two non-Mayan Amerindian languages, Xinca, an indigenous language, and Garifuna, an Arawakan language spoken on the Caribbean coast. According to the Language Law of 2003, the languages of Mayas, Xincas, and Garifunas are recognized as national languages.

List of languages of Guatemala

References